NASCAR Goes Country is a country music cover album. Originally released in 1975 by MCA Records, and later re-released in 2002 by Speedway Records, the album features eleven songs with lead vocals by NASCAR drivers Richard Petty; David Pearson; Cale Yarborough; Bobby Allison; Buddy Baker; and Darrell Waltrip. The Jordanaires contributed to additional backing vocals.

Track listing

Credits and personnel

Richard Petty – vocals
David Pearson – vocals
Cale Yarborough – vocals
Bobby Allison – vocals
Buddy Baker – vocals
Darrell Waltrip – vocals
The Jordanaires – vocals
Harold Bradley – bass, banjo
James Colvard – lead guitar
Bob Moore – bass
Ron Oates – piano
Kelso Herston – rhythm guitar
Buddy Harman – drums
Bobby Thompson – rhythm guitar, banjo
Charlie McCoy – harmonica
Lloyd Green – steel guitar
Bill Haynes – producer
Milton Blackford – producer
Walter Haynes – technical director
Jim Donoho – talent coordinator
Joe Mills – engineer
Bobby Bradley – engineer
Vic Gabany – engineer

Release history

See also
1975 in country music
1975 NASCAR Winston Cup Series
Marty Robbins

References

Further reading

1975 compilation albums
Country albums by American artists
Country music compilation albums
Covers albums
MCA Records compilation albums
NASCAR mass media